Martha Maria "Mattie" Hughes Cannon (July 1, 1857 – July 10, 1932) was a Utah State Senator, physician, Utah women's rights advocate, suffragist, polygamous wife, and a Welsh-born immigrant to the United States. Her family immigrated to the United States as converts to the Church of Jesus Christ of Latter-day Saints (LDS Church) and traveled West to settle in Utah territory with other Saints. She started working at the age of fourteen. At sixteen she enrolled in the University of Deseret, now called the University of Utah, receiving a Bachelors in Chemistry. From there she attended the University of Michigan and received her MD. She became the fourth of six wives in a polygamous marriage to Angus M. Cannon, a prominent Latter-day Saint leader during the anti-polygamy crusade. Cannon exiled herself to Europe so she wouldn't have to testify against her husband. Upon returning to Utah, Cannon worked as a doctor and fought for women's rights. She helped put women enfranchisement into Utah's constitution when it was granted statehood in 1896. On November 3, 1896 Cannon became the first female State Senator elected in the United States, defeating her own husband, who was also on the ballot. Martha Hughes Cannon was the author of Utah sanitation laws and was a founder and member of Utah's first State Board of Health.

Biography

Early life
Martha Maria Hughes Cannon was born near Llandudno, Caernarfonshire, Wales on July 1, 1857, the daughter of Peter Hughes and Elizabeth Evans. She was known by the nickname "Mattie". The Hughes family were converts to the Church of Jesus Christ of Latter-day Saints and emigrated to the United States with their two daughters, Mary Elizabeth and Martha Maria. They embarked from Liverpool, England on March 30, 1860, on the ship Underwriter and arrived in New York City, New York on May 1, 1860. Peter was very sick at the time and Elizabeth gave birth to their third child, Annie Lloyd. They stayed in New York to earn money to travel the plains to Utah territory. Erastus Snow, a Mormon leader, invited the family to join a pioneer company funded by the LDS Church for the less fortunate. The family accepted the invitation and traveled by train to Florence, Nebraska, and left with The Joseph Horne Company on July 11, 1861. Shortly before the family's arrival in the Salt Lake Valley, on September 3, 1861, Martha's sister Annie Lloyd Hughes died and was buried in an unmarked grave. She was 21 months old. The Joseph Horne company arrived in the Salt Lake valley on September 13, 1861. Three days after they arrived in Salt Lake City, on September 17, 1861, Peter Hughes died. Elizabeth Hughes was left a widow with two young daughters at the age of 28. Thirteen months later, Elizabeth married James Patten Paul, a widower with four sons, thereafter giving birth to the later Latter-day Saints university professor and newspaper editor Joshua Hughes Paul. After Elizabeth's marriage to James P. Paul, Martha, at different times in her life, went by the surnames of both Paul and Hughes. Later in life, Paul encouraged Martha to follow her dream of becoming a medical doctor.

Education and career

At age fourteen, Hughes taught school for a year, but quit when she had trouble controlling her larger male students. Brigham Young asked Hughes to learn typesetting and she worked as an apprentice for Hyrum Perry. Hughes first worked as a typesetter for the Deseret News. Later she worked as a typesetter for the Women's Exponent, a women's newspaper in Salt Lake City published by Emmeline B. Wells and affiliated with the Mormon Relief Society. While working at the Women's Exponent, Hughes met Emmeline B. Wells and Eliza Snow. These two women were her mentors and encouraged Hughes in her aspiration to become a doctor.

In an October 1873 General Conference address, Brigham Young encouraged women, specifically, to enter the medical field and become doctors. The same year, at age sixteen, Martha Hughes enrolled in the University of Deseret as a pre-med major, working as a typesetter during the day while taking night classes. She graduated from the University of Deseret in 1878 with a degree in chemistry.

On August 13, 1878, Hughes was one of four women set apart for medical studies and practice by the LDS Church. President John Taylor and his counselor George Q. Cannon set them apart. The other three women were Romania B. Pratt, Ellis R. Shipp, and Maggie Shipp. Pratt and Ellis Shipp had already received their medical degrees while Maggie Shipp and Hughes were heading out to earn theirs.  Ellis R. Shipp and Maggie Shipp were plural wives of Milford Shipp. Maggie had been watching Ellis's children in the Utah Territory while Ellis earned her MD. Now as Hughes was heading to the University of Michigan for her MD, Maggie was taking her turn to become a doctor as well.

Hughes started at the University of Michigan in the autumn of 1878. With limited funds, she spent her first year working in the student dormitories. During Hughes' second year she worked as a secretary for another student, Bethenia Owens-Adair. She graduated July 1, 1880, on her 23rd birthday. She briefly practiced medicine in Algonac, Michigan. In 1881, she moved to Philadelphia to take post-graduate courses at the Auxiliary Medical Department of the University of Pennsylvania. Hughes was the only women out of 75 students. Additionally, Hughes took night classes to learn more about pharmaceuticals and enrolled at the National School of Elocution and Oratory. In 1882, she earned a Bachelors of Science from the University of Pennsylvania and a bachelor's degree in Oratory (B.O.) at the National School of Elocution and Oratory. At 25 Martha Hughes had earned four degrees.

Hughes returned to Salt Lake City, Utah and opened a private practice in a new wing of her old home built by her step-father. Soon after, she was called by LDS Church leaders to become the resident physician for the newly founded Deseret Hospital in 1882. As the Deseret Hospital's paid physician, Hughes set up training classes for nurses and lectures on obstetrics.

Plural marriage and exile
While working at the Deseret Hospital, Martha met a Mormon polygamist, Angus Munn Cannon, who was the superintendent of the new hospital and a local official of the LDS Church. Mormon polygamy was a hot topic in Utah Territory. To the Mormons polygamy was sacred but to the rest of the United States it was offensive. In 1882 the Edmunds Act was passed by Congress making polygamy a felony punishable by a $500 fine and five years in prison. When Martha married in the Mormon temple to Angus on October 6, 1884, becoming the fourth of his six plural wives, the marriage was kept secret as it was a religious ceremony rather than a legally binding contract. Martha Cannon's mother knew nothing of the ceremony. Still, rumors of her marriage to Angus brought pressure to the Deseret Hospital. Martha Hughes Cannon was called to testify before the court, but Cannon eluded federal officers. Angus was also called to testify and after a court hearing, was sent to jail. Cannon joined the Mormon "underground" seeking to avoid providing federal marshals with proof of her plural marriage to Angus. She also feared being forced to provide testimony against others, based on information gathered through her obstetrical practice. Cannon found that she was pregnant after Angus was sent to jail. She had her first child, Elizabeth Rachel, while in hiding and with Angus still in captivity. Evading warrants in 1886, she decided to visit her mother's relatives in Europe and chose to exile herself from Utah territory. Only a few days before her departure, Angus married his fifth wife, Maria Bennion, who was six months younger than Martha. Cannon and her baby, Elizabeth, traveled to New York and then to Europe. Cannon first stayed with her uncle in Birmingham. However, Elizabeth grew sick and Cannon, fearing for her daughter's life, moved to Wolverton near Stratford-upon-Avon to stay with other relatives. During Cannon's self-exile, her letters to Angus show increasing jealousy and resentment of his new wife. Cannon wrote to Angus about Elizabeth's improving health also adding, "perhaps at this very moment you are basking in the smiles of your young Maria." In 1887 Angus married Johanna Danielson, while Cannon was exiled in Europe, unable to return to Utah for fear of having to testify. Later that year Angus's son, Lewis, traveled to England while waiting for a passport for Switzerland to proselytize. Cannon met him and together they toured Wales, Paris, and Switzerland. However, Cannon was increasingly homesick, and in December 1887 left Liverpool on the SS Arizona bound for New York. To her surprise, Angus met Cannon and Elizabeth as they arrived.

Recently published correspondence between Cannon and her husband during this period provides a window into 19th-century polygamous life in Utah and also on "the underground" just prior to the practice's abolition. It was a time when many polygamous families went into hiding to avoid legal pressures which threatened to sever polygamous families.

As a suffragist

The Edmunds–Tucker Act was passed while Cannon was in exile. In an effort to limit Mormon religious leadership in government, the act disenfranchised women of the Utah territory who had been voting in elections since 1870. The women of Utah territory had previously enjoyed voting rights, and they began to rally together to fight for suffrage. After Cannon returned she became a leader in the Utah Women's Suffrage Association, giving speeches in Utah and traveling to suffrage conferences with Susan B. Anthony and Elizabeth Cady Stanton. At the World's Columbian Exposition of 1893, Martha Hughes Cannon was featured as a speaker of the Women's Congress. She then traveled to Washington D.C. to give a status report to a congressional committee on women's suffrage work in Utah.

In her fight for women suffrage, Cannon felt that education, freedom, and purpose were vitally important for mothers, stating:

She defended polygamy, believing wives in a polygamous marriage may in fact have more freedom than a monogamous marriage stating that if a husband had more than one wife, that wife had freedom in the weeks her husband was away visiting his other wives. In February 1927, three decades after becoming the first women state senator of the United States, Cannon attended the 30th annual convention of the American Woman Suffrage Association in Washington D.C.

Political career

After 1888, Cannon resumed her Salt Lake medical practice and taught nursing courses through a school established at Deseret Hospital. By 1896, a suffrage clause in the new state constitution had restored the right to vote to Utah women. In a heavily publicized election, Cannon was one of five Democrats running as "at large" candidates for state senator from Salt Lake County. Suffrage activist Emmeline B. Wells and Cannon's husband Angus were among the Republicans running for the office. The five candidates with the largest quantity of votes were elected.

On November 3, 1896, Martha Hughes Cannon became the first woman elected as a state senator in the United States with 10,288 votes while her husband only received 8,054 votes. The couple reported that no relationship issues were produced from the election. Cannon introduced three bills in her first month in state senate. In consequence of her bill, an Act Providing for Compulsory Education of Deaf, Dumb, and Blind Citizens, Governor Heber Wells appointed Cannon to the board of directors for the school for the Deaf and Dumb. During her second term as State Senator, she drafted a bill for the building of a hospital at the Deaf and Dumb school. Her second bill was an Act to Protect the Health of Women and Girl Employees. The bill protected women and girls by requiring employers to give female employees something to rest on when they weren't serving customers. At the time nothing was provided and many female employees were left exhausted. Her last bill from her first month in office was an Act Creating a State Board of Health and Defining its Duties.

Cannon also sponsored the State's first pure food law. She fought against lobbyists trying to abolish the State Board of Public Examiners. The board was in charge of certifying the qualifications of doctors and midwives, preventing impersonators from potentially hurting patients. As a doctor, Cannon took personal interest in fighting against the lobbyists attempting to terminate an association that protected physicians. In 1898 at the invitation of officials of the National American Woman's Suffrage Association, two years after becoming the country's first woman state senator, Cannon spoke at the Seneca Falls 50th year celebration in Washington D.C. Cannon also testified before the U.S. House Committee on the Judiciary of the positive effects of women's franchise in Utah. Twenty-two years later, women's suffrage was added as the 19th amendment to the United States Constitution.

During the second half of her term in Utah's state senate, Cannon set up a commission that provided for regulations regarding contagious disease. She was appointed to the Board of Health by Governor Heber Wells, staying in the position until December 31, 1903. Cannon attempted to prohibit children not vaccinated from attending school in case of a disease outbreak. The Board of Health sent out vaccines; however, the Deseret News spread information that vaccines weren't safe. LDS Church leaders were divided on the subject. One apostle, Brigham Young Jr. was very vocal in his opinions, writing in the Deseret News about the evils of vaccinations. The influence of the Deseret News and Mormon religious leaders limited how many people were willing to be vaccinated. Disease grew rampant in the state of Utah, and the smallpox epidemic of 1898–1899 closed an entire town in Sanpete County. The epidemic Cannon tried to prevent began to spread through the state. To mitigate the effects of disease, Cannon eliminated communal cups attached to water fountains in Salt Lake valley.

Cannon's third child was born at the close of her term and subsequently she did not run again for office. At the end of her term, Deseret News wrote, "In political conventions, her wit, rapid thinking, and knowledge made her capable of holding her own and of representing her sex most favorably." Cannon lost only one bill: an Act Providing for the Teaching in the Public Schools of the Effects of Alcoholic Drinks and Narcotics on the Human System

Last years, death, and legacy
After leaving the legislature, Cannon still served as a member of the Utah Board of Health and as a member of the board of the Utah State School for the Deaf and Dumb. In 1902 she became a member of the psychology section of the Medico-Legacy Society of New York. The society's main focus was tuberculosis. In 1904 Cannon moved to California with her children for health reasons and became the vice president of the National Congress of Tuberculosis. She also worked at the Selwyn Emmett Graves Memorial Dispensary. After her husband's death in 1915, Cannon settled near her son in Los Angeles, California where he built Cannon her own home. She died in Los Angeles on July 10, 1932. Cannon's body was laid to rest at the Salt Lake City Cemetery next to her husband.

In 1986 the new Utah Department of Health building was dedicated and named the Martha Hughes Cannon health building in Salt Lake City. An eight-foot-high bronze statue of Martha Hughes Cannon by Laura Lee Stay Bradshaw, dedicated in 1996, was housed in the Utah Capitol rotunda.  Her grandson, Robert J. Cannon, spoke at the dedication.  After the Utah Capitol re-dedication in 2008, the bronze statue of Cannon was moved to the foyer of the Utah State Senate building on Utah Capitol Hill. There is also a bronze plaque honoring the "author of Utah sanitation laws" on a boulder next to a drinking fountain on the northeast corner of 200 West and South Temple. Since 1990, Utah officials have lobbied the U.S. Postal Service for a stamp in Cannon's honor. In 2011 a group of students at Brigham Young University created a stage play and later a film about five strong females of faith, which included Martha Hughes Cannon. In October 2015 legislators formed the Martha Hughes Cannon caucus in an effort to encourage more women in Utah to participate in government. KUED produced an hour-long documentary on Martha Hughes Cannon's life. The Utah State Legislature voted in 2018 to send a statue of Martha Hughes Cannon to the United States Capitol's National Statuary Hall in 2020, replacing the extant statue of inventor Philo Farnsworth.

In popular culture
In 2020, Her Quiet Revolution, a historical fiction novel about Cannon's life and work by American author Marianne Monson, appeared in commemoration of the 100th anniversary of US women’s suffrage.

See also
Cannon Family
Women's suffrage in Utah

Footnotes

Further reading
 Constance L. Lieber and John Sillito (eds.), "Letters from Exile: The Correspondence of Martha Hughes Cannon and Angus M. Cannon, 1886–1888."  Salt Lake City, UT: Signature Books, 1993.
 Patricia Lyn Scott and Linda Thatcher (eds.), Women in Utah History: Paradigm or Paradox? Logan, UT: Utah State University Press, 2005.
 Dr. Martha: The Life of a Pioneer Physician, Politician, and Polygamist by Mari Graña, Taylor Trade Publishing, 2015,

External links
 Information on Cannon's statue at the Utah Capitol rotunda.
 Martha Hughes Cannon Documentary produced by KUED

1857 births
1932 deaths
American women's rights activists
Burials at Salt Lake City Cemetery
Cannon family
Mormon pioneers
University of Michigan Medical School alumni
University of Pennsylvania alumni
University of Utah alumni
Democratic Party Utah state senators
Welsh emigrants to the United States
Welsh Latter Day Saints
Women state legislators in Utah
American suffragists
American women physicians
Physicians from Utah
People from Llandudno
19th-century American women politicians
19th-century American politicians
Utah suffrage
Activists from Utah
Mormon feminists
Harold B. Lee Library-related 19th century articles